In enzymology, an AMP—thymidine kinase is an enzyme that catalyzes the chemical reaction

AMP + thymidine  adenosine + thymidine 5'-phosphate

Thus, the two substrates of this enzyme are AMP and thymidine, whereas its two products are adenosine and thymidine 5'-phosphate.

This enzyme belongs to the family of transferases, specifically those transferring phosphorus-containing groups (phosphotransferases) with an alcohol group as acceptor.  The systematic name of this enzyme class is AMP:thymidine 5'-phosphotransferase. This enzyme is also called adenylate-nucleoside phosphotransferase.

References

 
 

EC 2.7.1
Enzymes of unknown structure